Maher Al-Sayed (born 13 March 1979 in Damascus, Syria) is a former Syrian football player who used to play for Al-Wahda and Al-Jaish in the Syrian League. He played 109 matches for Syria, scoring 29 goals. He is the younger brother of Hussam Al Sayed.

International Career Stats

Goals for Senior National Team

See also
 List of men's footballers with 100 or more international caps

References

External links
 
 

1979 births
Living people
Syrian footballers
Syria international footballers
Syrian expatriate footballers
Association football forwards
Syrian expatriate sportspeople in Jordan
Syrian expatriate sportspeople in Kuwait
Al-Jaish Damascus players
al-Shorta Damascus players
Al-Nasr SC (Kuwait) players
FIFA Century Club
Expatriate footballers in Kuwait
Footballers at the 2006 Asian Games
Sportspeople from Damascus
Asian Games competitors for Syria
Syrian Premier League players
Al-Wahda SC (Syria) players
Kuwait Premier League players